Charles "Bo" Outlaw (born April 13, 1971) is an American former professional basketball player. He was born in San Antonio, Texas, and is a 1989 alumnus of John Jay High School. 

Outlaw led the Mustangs to a 38-0 record his senior year before losing to Clear Lake High School in the state championship game. Outlaw played for South Plains College and the University of Houston. During his time in Houston, he averaged 14.0 ppg, 9.1 rpg, and led NCAA Division I with a field goal percentage of .684. In 1993, he declared eligibility for the NBA draft but was not selected.

Professional career 
Outlaw began his professional career in the CBA, where he averaged a league-leading 3.8 blocks per game in the half-season he played for the Grand Rapids Hoops.

On February 15, 1994, Outlaw began his NBA career with the Los Angeles Clippers, recording 13 points and 7 rebounds in a 100–89 win over the Los Angeles Lakers. He played three full seasons for the Clippers, who made the playoffs in 1997 but were defeated by the Utah Jazz in the first round.

Orlando Magic 
Outlaw left Los Angeles as a free agent and signed a two-year deal with the Orlando Magic on September 5, 1997.

During Outlaw's 1997–98 season, he started in 76 of 82 regular season games and recorded what would remain career-high averages in every statistical category except for assists. However, the Magic failed to reach the playoffs in 1998. After Hall of Fame coach Chuck Daly retired and was replaced by Doc Rivers, Outlaw signed another contract with the Magic in the off-season, after which he played two and a half more seasons for the team.

On April 17, 1998, Outlaw recorded 25 points, 13 rebounds, and 10 assists in a 121–109 win over the New Jersey Nets. After the game, reporters asked him how he felt about his first triple-double, to which Outlaw famously replied: "What's that, some kind of hamburger?".

Phoenix, Memphis, and returns to Phoenix and Orlando 
Outlaw was released in November 2001 and acquired by the Phoenix Suns. After one and a half seasons with them, Outlaw left for Memphis where he was reunited with former Magic teammate Mike Miller. In 2004, after one season in Memphis, Outlaw returned to Phoenix where he was hampered by nagging injuries and his playing time was restricted by the strength of the team. Accordingly, in the 2005–06 season, he returned to the Magic, appearing in 75 additional games in the course of three seasons. Outlaw was waived in November 2007 after playing 7 minutes over two games in the 2007–08 season.

Over his NBA career (914 games) he averaged 5.4 points and 4.9 rebounds. He currently resides in Orlando.

References

External links

 

1971 births
Living people
African-American basketball players
American expatriate basketball people in Spain
American men's basketball players
Basketball players from San Antonio
CB Estudiantes players
Centers (basketball)
Grand Rapids Hoops players
Houston Cougars men's basketball players
Liga ACB players
Los Angeles Clippers players
Memphis Grizzlies players
Orlando Magic players
Phoenix Suns players
Power forwards (basketball)
South Plains Texans basketball players
Undrafted National Basketball Association players
21st-century African-American sportspeople
20th-century African-American sportspeople